The 1911–12 RPI men's ice hockey season was the 9th season of play for the program.

Season
After starting the season extending the team's consecutive losses to 7, Rensselaer recovered in the final two games of the year.

Note: Rensselaer's athletic teams were unofficially known as 'Cherry and White' until 1921 when the Engineers moniker debuted for the men's basketball team.

Roster

Standings

Schedule and Results

|-
!colspan=12 style=";" | Regular Season

References

RPI Engineers men's ice hockey seasons
RPI
RPI
RPI
RPI